Swainsona monticola, commonly known as Notched Swainson-pea, is a small perennial plant in the pea family Fabaceae that is native to New South Wales, Australia. The habitat is in elevated areas on woodland or rocky slopes. The lectotype was collected by Allan Cunningham in the Blue Mountains. 

A low growing plant with compound leaves 5 to 10 cm long, with 11 to 25 leaflets. Purple flowers form from spring to autumn on racemes of three to fifteen flowers. The seed pod is hairless, oblong or elliptical in shape 8 to 15 mm long. The specific epithet (monticola) is derived from the Latin mons, meaning "mountain" and cola, meaning "dweller", referring to the montane habitat.

References 

monticola
Fabales of Australia
Flora of New South Wales
Plants described in 1864